Awkward is a children's graphic novel written by Svetlana Chmakova. The book tells the story of Penelope "Peppi" Torres, a new student at Berrybrook Middle School, whose first encounter with a boy from the science club leads to much awkwardness between them, and their sparring clubs.

Themes 
Awkward's main theme is that of friendship, directly addressing the mocking boys and girls get for being friends, and the hardships of navigating friend group drama. It also touches on growing up, and not putting yourself in a box.

The fourth book in the series, Diary, features additional stories with the characters from Awkward.

Reception and awards 
Awkward has received largely positive reviews by book critics.  Amanda M. Vail of The Mary Sue said "it needs to be on the shelves of every school and public library." Awkward was named as one of the School Library Journal Top 10 Graphic Novels of 2015.  It was also named by YALSA on their list of the 2016 Great Graphic Novels for Teens.

Awkward won the 2nd Annual Dwayne McDuffie Award for Kids' Comics, Dragon Award for Kids Comics at the 2016 Shuster Awards, and was nominated for the Eisner Award for Best Publication for Teens.

Publication information 
 Author: Svetlana Chmakova
 Originally published: July 15, 2015
 Publisher: Yen Press, an imprint of Hachette Book Group
 Lettering: JuYoun Lee
 Coloring Assistants: Ru Xu, Melissa McCommon

References 

American graphic novels
2015 graphic novels
Berrybrook
American young adult novels
Yen Press titles
School-themed comics